The Edinburgh and Dalkeith Railway opened Portobello railway station in July 1832. It remained in use until 1846 when a replacement station was opened nearby on the NBR Main Line.

History

References

Notes

Sources
 
 
 

Disused railway stations in Edinburgh
Railway stations in Great Britain opened in 1832
Railway stations in Great Britain closed in 1846
Former North British Railway stations